Indirect parliamentary elections were held in Cuba on 2 November 1976, the first since the Cuban Revolution. 

Between December 1975 and November 1976 voters had elected members of the 169 Municipal Assemblies, who in turn elected the 489 members of the National Assembly. Candidates had to be members of the Communist Party or mass organisations. Of the members elected to the National Assembly, 30% worked in industry or public services (including education), 29% were local government officials and 12% were civil servants. Municipal Assembly members also elected members of the 14 Provincial Assemblies.

In the municipal elections there were around 30,000 candidates, with over five million citizens casting their vote.

References

Cuba
Parliamentary elections in Cuba
Local elections in Cuba
1976 in Cuba
One-party elections
November 1976 events in North America
Election and referendum articles with incomplete results